Hospital ships should display large Red Crosses  or Red Crescents . The HS Awa Maru was displaying illuminated white crosses on its side when sunk.

See also
 List of hospital ships sunk in World War I

References

British World War II crimes

Hospital ships in World War II
Italian war crimes
Japanese war crimes
Nazi war crimes
World War II casualties
World War II crimes by the Allies
World War II crimes by the Axis